Hexeretmis argo is a moth of the family Alucitidae. It was described by Edward Meyrick in 1929. It is found in Peru.

References

Moths described in 1929
Alucitidae
Taxa named by Edward Meyrick